Maurice Grisard, (born 2 May 1895, date of death unknown) was a Belgian footballer and coach.

Honours
 Belgian D2 winners in : 1919

Coach career
 1925–1926: Royal Dolhain F.C.
 1926–1927: Fléron F.C.
 1930–1932: Standard de Liège
 1939–1940: Standard de Liège
 1951–1952: Standard de Liège with Antoine Basleer
 1952–1953: Standard de Liège
 1957–1959: Royal Spa F.C.

References

External links
 Player page

Belgian footballers
Standard Liège players
Belgian football managers
Standard Liège managers
1895 births
Year of death missing
Association football defenders